Palhinha may refer to:

 Palhinha (footballer, born 1950), Vanderlei Eustáquio de Oliveira, Brazilian retired footballer
 Palhinha (footballer, born 1967), Jorge Ferreira da Silva, Brazilian retired footballer
 João Palhinha (born 1995), Portuguese professional footballer